StatView is a statistics application originally released for Apple Macintosh computers in 1985.

StatView was one of the first statistics applications to have a graphical user interface, capitalizing on the Macintosh's. A user saw a spreadsheet of his or her data, comprising columns that could be integers, long integers, real numbers, strings, or categories, and rows that were usually cases (such as individual people for psychology data). Columns had informative headings; rows were numbered. Category data looked like strings (e.g., a column headed "sex" would have entries of "male" and "female", but these were coded by the application as integers). Category data were used to perform inferential statistical tests such as t tests, ANOVAs, and chi square tests. To calculate statistics, a user clicked on particular column headings, designating them as an x value and one or more y values. Then the user used the application's menus to choose descriptive statistics or inferential statistics.

For example, a user's spreadsheet might contain columns for names of a participant in a survey (a string), sex (a category variable), IQ (integer), and years using a PC (real). By designating number of years using a PC as an x variable and IQ as a y variable, the user could then choose from a menu to perform a regression. The user then had to choose from another menu how to view the regression in a separate window, either as a table, in which case the regression equation and ANOVA were displayed, or as a scattergram, in which case a graph of the data and the regression line were shown. Contents of the analysis window could be copied either as text or as a PICT.

StatView was initially distributed by BrainPower Inc from California. It grew up with the Macintosh, changing owners along the way. StatView 3 to 5 were distributed by Abacus Corporation. It was then bought by SAS which discontinued it in favor of JMP. The application continued to run under Classic emulation with Apple's Mac OS X, but could not run on Intel Macintoshes. , it still runs under OS 10.7.5 emulation using Basilisk II.

StatView 2 was called StatView SE + Graphics. It included ANOVA with one repeated-measure and, remarkably, a factor analysis. In StatView 4, the user approach changed from touching the to-be-analyzed data in the spreadsheet to clicking on column names in a separate window. This lack of immediacy was compensated for by an increase in the number of statistical tests that could be performed and in the power of existing tests. For example, multiway repeated-measures factors could be included in ANOVAs, with the only limit being the memory allocated to the application. There were ANCOVA and MANOVA too. StatView 4 also became available for PCs.

Statview 5.01 for Windows runs without issue on Windows XP, Windows 7 Home and Pro, both 32- and 64-bit systems. (This does not appear to actually be the case, the only method on Windows 7 appears to be using XP Mode.) It appears to run without issue in Windows 8 under Classic Shell.  Despite its lack of availability and support and the difficulty of running the application on Mac computers current in 2009, StatView still has some loyal users.

A former StatView employee is sometimes able to rescue old data trapped in StatView formats and offers this service in exchange for charitable contributions to worthy causes.

References

Further reading
 

Apple Inc. software
Macintosh-only software
1985 software
Statistical software